Wen Qimei (13 February 1867 – 5 October 1919; born Wen Suqin) was the mother of Mao Zedong.

Life
Wen was born in 1867 in the valley of Sidutaiping, in Xiangxiang county of Hunan. Her father, Wen Qifu, was a poor shoemaker who was a heavy drinker. Her mother was a 14 year old concubine of Qifu's when she was born. She had two brothers and two sisters and attended the local Buddhist nunnery for education until she was 10. Her father would beat her mother, so they fled to Shaoshan, Hunan. There, Suqin's mother remarried a 60 years old landowner, which was quite unusual in mainland China at that time. Suqin attended a Baptist school there and passed with honors. At the age of 13, her stepfather arranged her marriage to 10 year old Mao Yichang, who came from a long line of peasants. At the age of 26, Suqin gave birth to Mao Zedong.

After the birth of Mao Zedong, his parents were presented with a rooster, as was the local custom. Wen was concerned for her baby's health, having had two sons previously died in infancy. She took the baby to see a Buddhist monk who was living in the mountains, and asked the monk to take care of him. The monk refused, believing that baby Zedong appeared healthy. From there, she traveled to her father's house in a neighboring district, along the way stopping at a temple devoted to the bodhisattva Guan Yin, where she prayed that the deity would become Zedong's foster mother.

She died of lymphatic cancer on October 5, 1919.

References

Footnotes

Bibliography

 
 
 
 
 
 

1867 births
1919 deaths
People from Xiangtan
Mao Zedong family
Chinese farmers
Chinese women farmers
Deaths from lymphoma
Deaths from cancer in China